Xantusia wigginsi, Wiggins's desert night lizard, is a species of lizard in the family Xantusiidae. It is a small lizard found in California and Mexico.

References

Xantusia
Reptiles described in 1952
Reptiles of the United States
Reptiles of Mexico
Taxa named by Jay M. Savage